Diplacodes nebulosa (the black-tipped percher, black-tipped ground skimmer or charcoal-winged percher) is a species of dragonfly in the family Libellulidae. It is a widely distributed species in many Asian countries. and northern Australia.

Description and habitat
Diplacodes nebulosa is a very small and slender dragonfly.
Males have a black abdomen and black wing tips; females are yellow and black, and their wings can be hyaline, or with an orange base, or, like the male, have black tips.

Gallery

It prefers marshes and heavily weeded ponds.

See also
 List of odonates of Sri Lanka
 List of odonates of India
 List of Odonata species of Australia

References

 nebulosa.html World Dragonflies
 Animal diversity web
 Query Results 

Libellulidae
Odonata of Asia
Odonata of Australia
Insects of Indonesia
Insects of Southeast Asia
Insects of India
Taxa named by Johan Christian Fabricius
Insects described in 1793